The Plaza Aguacaliente & Grand Hotel Tijuana (commonly known by locals as Las Torres) is a high-rise complex of twin skyscrapers in Tijuana, Mexico. With a height of 89.9 meters (295 feet) to the top floor, and 28 stories, they were the tallest buildings in Tijuana and Baja California upon completion in 1982 and were among the first skyscrapers constructed in the city.

History
The towers were developed by the Bustamante family, a traditional family of the city and among the initial developers of the city, including the partial development in the mid-60's of Playas de Tijuana.

It was known as the Hotel Fiesta Americana then it changed to Grand Hotel sometimes around 1990.

Design
The complex consists of two towers, east and west towers, linked by two floor levels. East tower, Grand Hotel Tower I, is mainly for commercial purposes, while west tower, Grand Hotel Tower II, is home for the five-star grand hotel. The complex is located within the central business district of Tijuana, Zona Rio.

Gallery

See also

 List of hotels in Mexico
 List of companies of Mexico
 List of tallest buildings in Tijuana

References

External links

Grand Hotel Tijuana Official Site

Skyscrapers in Tijuana
Hotels in Mexico
Twin towers
Skyscraper office buildings in Mexico
Skyscraper hotels
Hotels established in 1982
Hotel buildings completed in 1982